Aleeze Nasser is a Dubai-based film actress and model. She made her debut in 2017's Pakistani film Yalghaar and will appear in Waar 2.

Early life and career
Aleeze Nasser was born on December 23, 1988 in Dubai, UAE. Her mother is a Turkish descent whereas her father is a Pakistani descent. When Aleeze was three years old, her mother came into Karachi for her studies and her father who is a Ph.D. in Physics, were settled in Dubai for their better future. She attended early schooling in Dubai and then moved to the United States where she attended New York Film Academy. She began her career as a model in Dubai. While working there she was approached by Hassan Rana and was offered a role in his film Yalghaar which she accepted. She was also offered to do a film with Denzel Washington. In an interview she has told: “I’ve been working with the Dubai Film Commission and was recently approached to star in a movie, which also features Denzel Washington.”  Aleeze then also signed the film Waar 2 and the film Sayyan in which she will appear as the lead actress with a leading actor which has yet to be confirmed.

Filmography

Films

References

External links

Living people
Pakistani female models
People from Dubai
Pakistani people of Turkish descent
1988 births
New York Film Academy alumni
21st-century Pakistani actresses